In mathematics, specifically homotopical algebra, an H-object is a categorical generalization of an H-space, which can be defined in any category  with a product  and an initial object . These are useful constructions because they help export some of the ideas from algebraic topology and homotopy theory into other domains, such as in commutative algebra and algebraic geometry.

Definition 
In a category  with a product  and initial object , an H-object is an object  together with an operation called multiplication together with a two sided identity. If we denote , the structure of an H-object implies there are mapswhich have the commutation relations

Examples

Magmas 
All magmas with units are secretly H-objects in the category .

H-spaces 
Another example of H-objects are H-spaces in the homotopy category of topological spaces .

H-objects in homotopical algebra 
In homotopical algebra, one class of H-objects considered were by Quillen while constructing André–Quillen cohomology for commutative rings. For this section, let all algebras be commutative, associative, and unital. These algebras have the addition and multiplication operationsNote that the multiplication map given above gives the H-object structure . Notice that in addition we have the other two structure maps given bygiving the full H-object structure. In fact, this implies  is an abelian group object in the category  since it gives a contravariant functor with values in Abelian groups.

See also 

 André–Quillen cohomology
Cotangent complex 
 H-space

References 

Category theory
Homotopical algebra